The Forgotten Sons was a professional wrestling stable in WWE consisting of Jaxson Ryker, Wesley Blake and Steve Cutler.

References

WWE teams and stables